Justus de Goede is a South African politician who served as a Member of the Gauteng Provincial Legislature between 2014 and 2019. He was a Member of the National Assembly of South Africa from 2013 to 2014. De Goede is a member of the Democratic Alliance.

Career

Parliament
On 1 December 2013, he was appointed to the National Assembly of South Africa to replace Ian Davidson as a member of the Democratic Alliance. De Goede also succeeded Davidson as Shadow Minister of International Relations and Cooperation.

Gauteng Provincial Legislature
For the general elections that were held on 7 May 2014, De Goede was placed twentieth on the DA's provincial list. He was elected to the Gauteng Provincial Legislature as the DA won 23 seats. He was sworn in as an MPL on 21 May 2014.

Prior to the 2019 Gauteng provincial election, De Goede was ranked number 54 on the party's provincial list. He did not return to the legislature as the DA won only 20 seats.

References

Living people
Year of birth missing (living people)
Democratic Alliance (South Africa) politicians
White South African people
Members of the Gauteng Provincial Legislature
Members of the National Assembly of South Africa